Rafał Sarnecki (born 8 January 1990) is a Polish professional racing cyclist. He rode at the 2015 UCI Track Cycling World Championships.

References

External links

1990 births
Living people
Polish male cyclists
People from Grudziądz
Olympic cyclists of Poland
Cyclists at the 2016 Summer Olympics
Cyclists at the 2019 European Games
European Games competitors for Poland